Aspidogastrida is an order of trematodes in the subclass Aspidogastrea.

Families
Superfamily Aspidogastrioidea Poche, 1907
Aspidogastridae Poche, 1907
Multicalycidae Gibson & Chinabut, 1984
Rugogastridae Schell, 1973

References

Further reading
Alves, P., Vieira, F., Santos, C., Scholz, T. & Luque, J. (2015). A checklist of the Aspidogastrea (Platyhelminthes: Trematoda) of the world. Zootaxa, 3918(3), 339–396.

Aspidogastrea
Platyhelminthes orders